Vyšší Brod is a town in Český Krumlov District in the South Bohemian Region of the Czech Republic. It has about 2,500 inhabitants. It is the southernmost municipality in the Czech Republic. Vyšší Brod Monastery, an important historic landmark, is located in the town. The historic town centre with the monastery complex is well preserved and is protected by law as an urban monument zone.

Administrative parts
Villages of Dolní Drkolná, Dolní Jílovice, Herbertov, Hrudkov, Lachovice, Studánky and Těchoraz are administrative parts of Vyšší Brod.

Geography
About two thirds of the municipal territory are located in the Bohemian Forest Foothills, the western part is located in the Bohemian Forest. The territory borders on the south with Austria, the Vyšší Brod Pass is located on the border.

Vyšší Brod lies on the Vltava river. Watercourses Menší Vltavice and Větší Vltavice flow into the Vltava in Vyšší Brod. The Lipno II Reservoir is located by the town and fed by the Vltava.

History

Vyšší Brod was founded on an old trade route near a ford across the Vltava, hence the name. The first written mention of the settlement is from 1259 in the deed of foundation of Cistercian monastery, where Vok I of Rosenberg confirms the donation of a large area for the benefit of this monastery and mentions the market settlement of Vyšší Brod and the church. The settlement was probably founded much earlier.

In 1870, Vyšší Brod was promoted to a town by Emperor Franz Joseph I. After 1918, the coexistence of the German-speaking majority and the Czech minority stabilized. After the World War II, most of the ethnic German population was expelled and was resettled by mostly non-native population. The Iron Curtain was established and the monastery was forcibly abolished.

After the opening of borders in 1989, the town's importance strongly grew due to the direct road to the border crossing at Studánky / Weigetschlag. In 1990 the monks returned to the monastery.

Demographics

Transport
Vyšší Brod lies on the railway line of local importance from Rybník to Lipno nad Vltavou.

The road border crossing Studánky / Weigetschlag is located at the Vyšší Brod Pass in the municipal territory.

Sights

The Cistercian Vyšší Brod Monastery with its Church of the Assumption of the Virgin Mary is the most important building and the main landmark of the town. The monastery complex also houses a postal museum.

Other sights include the parish Church of Saint Bartholomew on the town square and the Marian pilgrimage site in Loučovice with Chapel of Maria Rast. The way to the chapel is lined by Stations of the Cross.

Notable people
Leopold Wackarž (1810–1901), Cistercian abbot general, died here
Franz Isidor Proschko (1816–1891), Austrian writer

Trivia
The asteroid no. 121089, which was discovered in 1999 by Miloš Tichý from the Kleť Observatory, was named after the town.

References

External links

Cities and towns in the Czech Republic
Populated places in Český Krumlov District
Bohemian Forest